Ahtem Chiygoz (born 14 December 1964, Bulungur, Uzbek SSR) is a Ukrainian Crimean Tatar politician. He is the Deputy Chairman of the Mejlis of the Crimean Tatar People, a People's Deputy of Ukraine in the current convocation, Chairman of the Bakhchysaray regional Mejlis, and delegate to the Qurultay of the Crimean Tatar People.

He is a former political prisoner of the Kremlin; following Russia's attempted annexation of Ukraine's Crimean peninsula he was arrested on January 29, 2015, and charged with organization of a rally in support of the territorial integrity of Ukraine that took place in Simferopol on February 26, 2014. He was freed on October 25, 2017.

In the 2019 Ukrainian parliamentary election, Chiygoz was elected to the Ukrainian parliament as a deputy for the party European Solidarity.

References 

1964 births
Living people
Crimean Tatar independence activists
Ukrainian exiles of the annexation of Crimea by the Russian Federation
Ninth convocation members of the Verkhovna Rada